Jennifer Bohun Hay  is a New Zealand linguist who specialises in sociolinguistics, laboratory phonology, and the history of New Zealand English. As of 2020 she is a full professor at the University of Canterbury.

Academic career 

In 2000, Hay gained a PhD titled Causes and Consequences of Word Structure at Northwestern University in Illinois in the Linguistics department. She moved to the University of Canterbury, and was appointed a full professor in 2010.

Hay's research has revealed that a New Zealand dialect took only a single generation to emerge. She has explored how speech perception and production is influenced by past experiences and current context, including environmental factors: for example, New Zealanders hear vowels differently if they are in a room with toy kangaroos and koalas as opposed to toy kiwi.

Hay is the director of the New Zealand Institute of Language, Brain and Behaviour, a multi-disciplinary research centre based at the University of Canterbury.

In 2017, Hay was featured in the Royal Society Te Apārangi's 150 women in 150 words project, celebrating the contributions of women to knowledge in New Zealand.

Awards 
Hay received a Rutherford Discovery Fellowship in 2011, a James Cook Research Fellowship and a University of Canterbury Research Award in 2015, and was made a Fellow of the Royal Society Te Apārangi in 2015.

Selected articles

Authored books 

 
 
 Rens Bod, Jennifer Hay, and Stefanie Jannedy. Probabilistic Linguistics. 2003. MIT Press.

References

External links 
 
 

Living people
New Zealand women academics
Women linguists
Year of birth missing (living people)
Northwestern University alumni
Academic staff of the University of Canterbury
Fellows of the Royal Society of New Zealand
Victoria University of Wellington alumni